Joan Puig i Ferreter (5 February 1882 – 2 February 1956) was a Catalan playwright and politician. He was a member of the Republican Left of Catalonia, whom he represented as a member of the Parliament of Catalonia during the Second Spanish Republic.

External links 
 Biografia de Joan Puig i Ferreter. Hiperenciclopèdia d'Esquerra Republicana de Catalunya
 Biografia de Joan Puig i Ferreter. Enciclopèdia Catalana

1882 births
1956 deaths
Catalan dramatists and playwrights
Members of the Parliament of Catalonia
People from Baix Camp